Griesheim-sur-Souffel is a commune in the Bas-Rhin département in Grand Est in north-eastern France. It is positioned about 8 kilometers to the northwest of the city centre of Strasbourg.

Griesheim-sur-Souffel is one of the 23 member communes of the Community of Communes of the Kochersberg.

Griesheim-sur-Souffel should not be confused with Griesheim-près-Molsheim, a slightly larger village positioned, as its name indicates, a short distance from Molsheim. The two Griesheims are less than twenty kilometres (twelve miles) apart.

The Souffel stream runs by the village's border with its neighbour village of Dingsheim.

See also
 Communes of the Bas-Rhin department
 Kochersberg

References

External links

Official site

Communes of Bas-Rhin
Bas-Rhin communes articles needing translation from French Wikipedia